No Tears may refer to:

 No Tears (TV serial), a 2002 Irish docudrama miniseries aired on RTÉ One
 No Tears (EP), by Tuxedomoon, or the title song, "No Tears (For the Creatures of the Night)"
 "No Tears", a song by James Blunt from Some Kind of Trouble
 "No Tears", a song by The Psychedelic Furs from Talk Talk Talk
 "No Tears", a song by Scarface from The Diary